Leighton Aspell (born 12 June 1976) is a retired Irish jockey, whose wins include the Champion Four Year Old Hurdle riding United, two runnings of the Welsh National, the 2014 Grand National riding Pineau de Re and the 2015 Grand National riding Many Clouds.

Personal life 
Leighton Aspell was born 12 June 1976 in Dublin, Ireland. He grew up in Narraghmore, County Kildare. Aspell has a brother, Paddy, who is also a jockey, and was originally taught to ride by his father, Patrick. He was later apprenticed to Reg Hollinshead. Aspell has a fan club, making him "one of the few jockeys" to have such a thing. He and his brother Paddy are second cousins of former Ireland Rugby international Shane Horgan and his actress sister Sharon Horgan.

Career 
Aspell has competed in seven Grand Nationals, winning both the 2014 and 2015 Grand Nationals and coming second in the 2003 Grand National (his debut), riding Supreme Glory.

Aspell had several other notable successes. He won the Welsh National on Supreme Glory in 2001 and the same race on L'Aventure in 2005. Also, in 2005, Aspell won the Grade I Champion Four Year Old Hurdle at Punchestown Racecourse on the Lucy Wadham-trained mare United. In 2006, Aspell came near to victory at the Grand National, riding Ballycassidy, but he fell at Valentine's Brook second time round.

In July 2007, Aspell announced his retirement from race riding, and left to work for trainer John Dunlop in Arundel. However, he began his comeback in April 2009, saying "I'm really looking forward to coming back. It's something that has been in the back of my mind, and the more I thought about it, the more I decided that I didn't want to find myself in ten years time regretting not having ridden for longer."

During the 2013–2014 season, Aspell had his best ever season, riding 61 winners so far. He was given the ride on Richard Newland's Pineau de Re in the 2014 Grand National after the horse's regular rider Sam Twiston-Davies opted to ride the more fancied Tidal Bay around three weeks prior to the race. After a false start, Aspell and Pineau de Re won the race by five lengths at odds of 25/1, winning £561,300 out of a £1,000,000 prize fund.

At the 2015 Grand National, Aspell rode Many Clouds, against a field of 38 including his previous winner Pineau de Re. Pre-race, favourite A. P. McCoy had odds of 7-1 riding Shutthefrontdoor, Aspell had odds of 25-1. Aspell's victory makes him the first back-to-back Grand National winner in over 40 years since Red Rum with rider Brian Fletcher, and only the third since World War II, along with Bryan Marshall. Aspell stated after the race that "that's the best ride I have had in the National", his riding won £561,300 from the £1 million pot.

Major wins
 Great Britain

 Grand National - (2) Pineau de Re (2014), Many Clouds (2015)
 Welsh Grand National - (2) Supreme Glory (2001), 	L'Aventure (2005)

 Ireland
 Champion Four Year Old Hurdle - (1) United (2005)

References 

1976 births
Living people
Irish jockeys
Irish expatriate sportspeople in the United Kingdom
Sportspeople from Dublin (city)
Lester Award winners
Sportspeople from County Kildare